Saint-Ouen-sur-Iton is a commune in the Orne department, region of Normandy, northwestern France.

The inhabitants are known as Audoniens and Audoniennes.

Demographics

The population has varied over the past 200 years:

See also
Communes of the Orne department

References

Saintouensuriton